Swamp cedar may refer to:

Chamaecyparis thyoides
Thuja occidentalis